The 2nd constituency of the Savoie (French: Deuxième circonscription de la Haute-Savoie) is a French legislative constituency in the Savoie département. Like the other 576 French constituencies, it elects one MP using a two round electoral system.

Description

The 2nd constituency of Savoie covers a large mountainous area in the east of the department and includes the town of Albertville.

The voters of the constituency have supported conservative candidates without exception at every election since 1988.

Assembly Members

Election results

2022

 
 
|-
| colspan="8" bgcolor="#E9E9E9"|
|-

2017

 
 
 
 
 
 
|-
| colspan="8" bgcolor="#E9E9E9"|
|-

2012

 
 
 
 
 
|-
| colspan="8" bgcolor="#E9E9E9"|
|-

References

2